Carsten Rothenbach (born 3 September 1980) is a German former professional footballer who played as a defender.

Career
Born in Heidelberg, Rothenbach made his professional debut in the 2. Bundesliga for Karlsruher SC on 13 August 2001 when he came on as a substitute in the 78th minute in a game against 1. FC Saarbrücken.

Career statistics

References

External links
 
 Carsten Rothenbach Interview

1980 births
Living people
German footballers
Association football defenders
Bundesliga players
2. Bundesliga players
Karlsruher SC II players
Karlsruher SC players
FC St. Pauli players
VfL Bochum players
VfL Bochum II players
Sportspeople from Heidelberg
Footballers from Baden-Württemberg